Auld is a surname. Notable people with the name include:

 Alex Auld (born 1981), Canadian hockey player
 Andrew Auld (1799–1873), Scottish ship's carpenter in Hawaii 
 Andy Auld (1900–1977), Scottish-American soccer player
 Bertie Auld (1938–2021), Scottish football player and manager
 Cathy Auld, Canadian curler
 Doug Auld (born 1962), American editor and publisher of Sprint Car & Midget Magazine
 Eric Auld (1931–2013), Scottish painter
 F. H. Auld (1881–1961), Canadian agricultural scientist and Saskatchewan's Deputy Minister of Agriculture 
 Georgie Auld (1919–1990), Canadian-American jazz tenor saxophonist, clarinetist and bandleader
 James Auld (disambiguation), multiple people
 John Auld (disambiguation), multiple people
 Patrick Auld, Australian winemaker, father of W. P. Auld
 Robin Auld (born 1937), judge in the English Court of Appeal
 Robin Auld (musician) (born 1959), South African singer-songwriter, guitarist, poet and writer
 W. P. Auld (1840–1912), Australian explorer, wine maker and merchant
 William Auld (1924–2006), Scottish author and Esperanto leader

See also
 Aulds (surname)
 Ault (disambiguation)
 Old (surname)
 Ould (surname)